E3 ubiquitin-protein ligase RNF34 is an enzyme that in humans is encoded by the RNF34 gene.

The protein encoded by this gene contains a RINF finger, a motif known to be involved in protein-protein and protein-DNA interactions. This protein interacts with DNAJA3/hTid-1, which is a DnaJ protein reported to function as a modulator of apoptosis. Overexpression of this gene in Hela cells was shown to confer the resistance to TNF-alpha induced apoptosis, suggesting an anti-apoptotic function of this protein. This protein can be cleaved by caspase-3 during the induction of apoptosis. Alternatively spliced transcript variants encoding distinct isoforms have been reported.

References

Further reading

RING finger proteins